Donald Kyle Stitt (November 26, 1944September 16, 2014) was a member of the Wisconsin State Assembly and Wisconsin State Senate, and a chairman of the Republican Party of Wisconsin.

Biography
Stitt was born on November 26, 1944 in Milwaukee, Wisconsin. He graduated from Whitefish Bay High School in Whitefish Bay, Wisconsin. Later, he graduated from the University of Wisconsin–Madison, Marquette University Law School and Georgetown University Law Center. Stitt was married with four children. He died on September 16, 2014 in Jacksonville, Florida.

Career
Stitt had been a member of the Port Washington, Wisconsin Board of Education from 1978 to 1984. Stitt was first elected to the Assembly in a special election in 1979 and was re-elected in 1980 and 1982. He was first elected to the Senate in 1984, representing the 20th District. During his time as a Senator, Stitt served as Chairman of the Republican Party of Wisconsin from 1988 to 1989. Stitt remained in the Senate until 1993, when he was succeeded by Mary Panzer.

After serving in the state legislature, Stitt became a partner in the law firm of Whyte, Hirschboeck Dudek.

References

Politicians from Milwaukee
People from Whitefish Bay, Wisconsin
People from Port Washington, Wisconsin
Republican Party of Wisconsin chairs
Republican Party Wisconsin state senators
Republican Party members of the Wisconsin State Assembly
School board members in Wisconsin
University of Wisconsin–Madison alumni
Marquette University Law School alumni
Georgetown University Law Center alumni
1944 births
2014 deaths
Wisconsin lawyers
20th-century American lawyers
Whitefish Bay High School alumni